The North American Boxing Association (NABA) is a boxing governing body which was established in 1997. It is affiliated with the World Boxing Association (WBA) and recognizes champions in 17 weight classes.

Its rules specify that fighters' titles are removed if they remain inactive for one year.

See also
List of NABA champions

References

External links
 

Professional boxing organizations
Boxing in North America
World Boxing Association